Scotland the Brave is a series of concerts celebrating Scottish music in Australia. Conducted by Colin Harper it was first held in  Brisbane Concert Hall in 1998. It returned to there in 1999 before moving to the Sydney Opera House later in the year and has since move onto other venues around Australia and internationally.

A 2000 Sydney Opera House concert was broadcast nationally by the ABC. A video of that concert was released and by November 2001 had sold around 30,000 copies with the CD version selling 20,000 copies.

Album
In 2000 ABC Classics released an album of highlights recorded at the Sydney Opera House concert on 10 June 2000. It was nominated for the 2001 ARIA Award for Best Cast or Show Album.

Track Listing
Wi A Hundred Pipers    
Isle Of Mull    
The Long Ships    
The Dark Island    
The Uist Tramping Song    
Dream Angus    
I'll Walk Beside You    
My Heart Is In The Highlands    
Banks Of Doon    
Skye Boat Song    
The Star Of Rabbie Burns    
Sleeps The Noon    
Annie Laurie    
The Song Of The Clyde    
Scottish Singalong    
Gude Wallace / The Gael    
Scots Whae Hae    
Highland Cathedral    
Amazing Grace    
Auld Lang Syne    
Will Ye No' Come Back Again

Personnel
 Colin Harper - Conductor
 Queensland Pops Orchestra
 Australian Concert Orchestra
 Piob Nam Albanach
 Pymble Ladies' College Choir
 Imogen Men's Chorus  
 Thomas Keenan - vocals
 Lisa Lockland - vocals
 Greg Moore* - vocals

References

External links
Scotland the Brave

Scottish music